Cave is both a surname and a given name. Notable people with the name include:

Surname:
Alexander Cave   (1900–2001), British anatomist
Andy Cave (born 1966), British mountaineer and author
Basil Cave (1865–1931), British diplomat
Charles Cave (disambiguation), various people
Charles John Philip Cave (1871–1950), British meteorologist
Darren Cave (born 1987), rugby union player
Edward Cave (1691–1754), English printer, editor, and publisher, founder of the first general-interest magazine
Etosha Cave, American mechanical engineer
Francis Oswin Cave (1897–1974), English army officer, priest, and ornithologist
George Cave, 1st Viscount Cave (1856–1928), British lawyer and Conservative politician
George Cave (footballer) (1874–1904), English footballer
Harry Cave (1922–1989), New Zealand cricketer
Hugh B. Cave (1910–2004), American pulp fiction writer
J. A. Cave (1823–1912), English musician, actor and theatre proprietor
Jake Cave (born 1992), American baseball player
Joyce Cave (1902–1953), English squash player
Kathryn Cave (born 1948), award-winning British children's book author
Lucie Cave, features editor of Heat magazine
Micky Cave (born 1949), English football midfielder
Nancy Cave (1896–1989), English squash player
Nick Cave (born 1957), leader of the Australian rock band Nick Cave and the Bad Seeds
Nick Cave (performance artist) (born 1959), American artist
Peter Cave, foreign affairs editor for the Australian Broadcasting Corporation
Phil Cave (born 1987), English football defender
Stephen Cave (1820–1880), British lawyer, writer, and Conservative politician
Wilbur Cave, American politician from South Carolina.
William Cave (1637–1713), English divine
William H. Cave (1872–1941), Newfoundland merchant and politician
William Cave (rugby union) (1882–1970), England and British Isles rugby union player

Given name:
Cave Beck (1623–c.1706), English schoolmaster and clergyman, author of an early constructed language
Cave Johnson (1793–1866), U.S. Congressman from Tennessee and United States Postmaster General

Fictional characters:
Cave Carson, character in science fiction stories published by DC Comics
Cave Johnson (Portal), character in Portal video games